Yellow Pinch Dam is a major off-stream ungated rockfill embankment dam across the Yellow Pinch Creek upstream of Merimbula in the South Coast region of New South Wales, Australia. The dam's main purpose is water supply. The impounded reservoir is also called Yellow Pinch Dam.

Location and features
The dam's secondary inflow is received from the Bega River via the Bega to Yellow Pinch Dam pipeline. The dam was built by the NSW Department of Public Works on behalf of the Bega Valley Shire Council to supply water to Merimbula, Tura Beach, Pambula Beach, Pambula and rural properties. The Yellow Pinch Dam, together with Ben Boyd Dam and Tilba Dam, also both off-stream, are used for storing water for town water supply, with water pumped, or piped by gravity, from a source water intake. The dams have small catchment areas and rainfall in the dam catchment areas contributes only a minor proportion of the volume of water collected and stored.

At 100% capacity the dam wall holds back  of water. The spillway is capable of discharging .

Bega to Yellow Pinch Dam Water Transfer Pipeline
The A$10 million federally-funded Bega to Yellow Pinch Dam Water Transfer Pipeline and pumping stations provides an additional source of water to secure water supplies for the Bega Valley Shire. This water is carried through a  pipeline to Yellow Pinch Dam. The benefits of the project include the protection of low environmental flows at Tantawanglo Creek by extracting and storing larger volumes of water during high Bega River flows; the increased security of supply to townships in the south of the Bega Valley Shire through the use of water from the lower Bega River; and providesfor greater flexibility and availability of water for landholder extraction in the upper catchment.

See also

 Irrigation in Australia
 List of dams and reservoirs in New South Wales

References

External links
 

Dams in New South Wales
Dams completed in 1987
South Coast (New South Wales)
Rock-filled dams